Tumwater School District is a school district headquartered in Tumwater, Washington.

 the enrollment is over 6,000. Of the school districts in Thurston County, this is the third-highest such figure.

Schools in the Tumwater area had been established by 1845.

Schools
 High schools
 Black Hills High School
 Tumwater High School
 Middle schools
 G. W. Bush Middle School
 Tumwater Middle School
 Elementary schools
 Black Lake Elementary School
 East Olympia Elementary School
 Littlerock Elementary School
 Michael T. Simmons Elementary School
 Peter G. Schmidt Elementary School
 Tumwater Hill Elementary School
 Other
 New Market Skills Center

References

External links
 Tumwater School District
School districts in Washington (state)
Education in Thurston County, Washington